Burr is a village in Otoe County, Nebraska, United States. The population was 57 at the 2010 census.

History
Burr was platted in the 1880s when the railroad was extended to that point. The community was named for the burr oak trees near the original town site.

Geography
Burr is located at  (40.536891, -96.300651).

Demographics

2010 census
As of the census of 2010, there were 57 people, 30 households, and 16 families living in the village. The racial makeup of the village was 100.0% White.

There were 30 households, of which 16.7% had children under the age of 18 living with them, 53.3% were married couples living together, and 46.7% were non-families. 40.0% of all households were made up of individuals, and 16.7% had someone living alone who was 65 years of age or older. The average household size was 1.90 and the average family size was 2.44.

The median age in the village was 51.3 years. 15.8% of residents were under the age of 18; 0% were between the ages of 18 and 24; 24.6% were from 25 to 44; 36.8% were from 45 to 64; and 22.8% were 65 years of age or older. The gender makeup of the village was 47.4% male and 52.6% female.

2000 census
At the 2000 census, there were 66 people, 36 households and 16 families living in the village. The population density was 784.7 per square mile (318.5/km2). There were 40 housing units at an average density of 475.6 per square mile (193.1/km2). The racial makeup of the village was 100.00% White.

There were 36 households, of which 11.1% had children under the age of 18 living with them, 44.4% were married couples living together, 2.8% had a female householder with no husband present, and 52.8% were non-families. 47.2% of all households were made up of individuals, and 25.0% had someone living alone who was 65 years of age or older. The average household size was 1.83 and the average family size was 2.65.

16.7% of the population were under the age of 18, 7.6% from 18 to 24, 21.2% from 25 to 44, 31.8% from 45 to 64, and 22.7% who were 65 years of age or older. The median age was 46 years. For every 100 females, there were 100.0 males. For every 100 females age 18 and over, there were 83.3 males.

As of 2000 the median income for a household was $35,000, and the median family income was $38,125. Males had a median income of $31,786 versus $23,750 for females. The per capita income for the village was $20,113. There were no families and 5.3% of the population living below the poverty line, including no under eighteens and 11.1% of those over 64.

Education
Burr is within the Johnson County Central Public Schools.

was formerly in Nemaha Valley Schools. In 2007 Nemaha Valley merged into Johnson County Central Public Schools.

Notable person
 Dean Steinkuhler - football offensive lineman for the Nebraska Cornhuskers and Houston Oilers, winner of the 1983 Outland Trophy and Lombardi Award

References

Villages in Otoe County, Nebraska
Villages in Nebraska